Honor Mary Crowley (19 October 1903 – 18 October 1966) was an Irish Fianna Fáil politician who served as a Teachta Dála (TD) for the Kerry South constituency from 1945 to 1966.

She was one of five daughters of the MP John Pius Boland, who won gold medals in Tennis at the 1896 Olympics in Athens. He was a member of the Irish Parliamentary Party, and represented South Kerry from 1900 until 1918.

A social worker before entering politics, Crowley was first elected to the 12th Dáil at the by-election on 4 December 1945 caused by the death of her husband, Fianna Fáil TD Frederick Crowley. She was re-elected at the next six general elections, and died in 1966 while still in office. She was the first woman to represent Ireland on a delegation to the Council of Europe in Strasbourg, which she did between 1954 and 1957.

The 1966 by-election following her death was won by the Fianna Fáil candidate, John O'Leary.

Her sister Bridget Boland was a playwright.

See also
Families in the Oireachtas

References

1903 births
1966 deaths
Fianna Fáil TDs
Members of the 12th Dáil
Members of the 13th Dáil
Members of the 14th Dáil
Members of the 15th Dáil
Members of the 16th Dáil
Members of the 17th Dáil
Members of the 18th Dáil
Presidential appointees to the Council of State (Ireland)
Spouses of Irish politicians
Place of birth missing
Place of death missing
Politicians from County Kerry
20th-century women Teachtaí Dála